Dizzy on the French Riviera is a 1962 live album by Dizzy Gillespie, arranged by Lalo Schifrin.

Track listing
 "No More Blues" (Antonio Carlos Jobim-Vinicius de Moraes) – 10:20
 "Long, Long Summer" (Lalo Schifrin) – 5:15
 "I Waited for You" (Gil Fuller, Dizzy Gillespie) – 2:44
 "Desafinado" (Jobim-Mendonça) – 3:27
 "Here It Is" (Gillespie) – 8:33
 "Pau de Arara" (Schifrin arrangement of the original Brazilian folk song by Luiz Gonzaga & Guio de Morais) – 3:38
 "For the Gypsies" (Gillespie) – 4:34

Personnel

Performance
 Lalo Schifrin – piano
 Dizzy Gillespie – trumpet, vocals
 Leo Wright - flute, alto saxophone, vocals
 Elek Bacsik - guitar
 Chris White (bassist) - double bass
 Rudy Collins - drums
 Pepito Riestria - percussion
 Charlie Ventura - tenor saxophone, bass saxophone

References 

Albums produced by Quincy Jones
Dizzy Gillespie live albums
1962 live albums
Philips Records live albums
Albums arranged by Lalo Schifrin
Albums recorded at Jazz à Juan